A list of universities, colleges and schools in Khulna, Bangladesh:

Universities
Khulna University, Gollamari, Khulna
Khulna University of Engineering and Technology, Fulbari Gate, Khulna
Khulna Agricultural University, Daulatpur, Khulna
Sheikh Hasina Medical University, Labanchara, Khulna
Northern University of Business and Technology Khulna
North Western University, Khulna
Khulna Digital University
America Bangladesh University

Medical colleges
Khulna Medical College
Khulna Dental College
Gazi Medical College
Ad-Din Akij Medical College
Khulna City Medical College
Khulna Nursing College
Khulna Homoeopathic Medical College

Colleges
 Govt. B.L. College (HSC, Honors, Masters), Daulatpur, Khulna
 Azam Khan Govt. Commerce College (HSC, Honors, Masters), Babu Khan Road
 Khulna Govt. Girls College (Honors, Masters), Boyra, Khulna
 Govt. M.M. City College, Khulna
 Govt. Sundarban Adarsha College, Khulna
 Govt. Pioneer Woman's College, South-Central Road, Khulna
 Govt. Bangabandhu College, Rupsha, Khulna
 Haji Mohammad Mohasin College (Honours), Khalishpur, Khulna
Khulna Public College, Boyra, Khulna
Jahanabad Cantonment Public School & College, Cantonment, Gilatola, Khulna
Bangladesh Navy School & College, Goalkhali, Khulna
Khulna Collegiate Girls' School & College, Rupsha, Khulna
Islamia Degree College, Boyra, Khulna
 Khulna College
Daulatpur College (Day/Night), Daulatpur, Khulna
Ahsanullah College (Honours), Khulna
Saburunessa Girls' College, Gagan Babu Road, Khulna
Sarowar Khan Degree College, Senhati, Khulna
Rayermohal Degree College, Rayarmohol, Khulna
 Shaheed Smrity Mohila College, Dumuria
 Moulana vasane Beddapeth girl school & college
 Rupsha College, East Rupsha, Khulna

Government schools
 Khulna Zilla School
 Govt. Coronation Secondary Girls' School
 Govt. Laboratory High School
 Khulna Govt. Girls' High School, Boyra, Khulna
 Govt. Daulatpur Muhsin High School
 Govt. Iqbal Nagar Girls' High School
 Govt. Model High School
 K.D.A. Khan Jahan Ali Govt. High School
 Deldar Ahmed Govt. High School, Khulna
 Salauddin Yusuf Govt High School, Khulna
 Khulna Govt. Model School and College
 Khulna Power Station High school, Khalispur, Khulna

Non government schools
 Military Collegiate School Khulna, Fultala, Khulna
 Khulna Public College, Boyra
 PMG High School, Boyra
 St. Joseph's High School, Khulna 
 Khulna Collegiate Girls' School
 Islamabad Collegiate School 
 Need School, Sonadanga, Khulna (Near Gollamari CSS School)
 Lions School, Khulna,
 SOS Herman miner school,
 Rotary High School
 Bangladesh Navy School and College, Khulna
 Port Secondary School, Khulna
 Sristy Central School & College, Khulna
Bangabashi high school Khalishpur khulna 
National high school Khalishpur khulna 
Crescent Secondary high school Khalishpur khulna
 Navy Anchorage School and College Khulna

Madrasah
Khulna Alia Kamil Madrasah
Khulna Nesaria Kamil Madrasah

IGV schools
UCEP-K C C School, Rupsha
UCEP-Sonadanga School, Sonadanga
UCEP-M A Majid School, Fulbarigate
UCEP-Khalishpur School, Khalishpur
UCEP-Zohra Samad School, Tootpara
UCEP-Wazed Ali School, Banorgati

Technical schools
Technical Training Center Khulna, Fulbarigate, Khulna
Khulna Shipyard Technical Training Center, Shipyard Main Road, Rupsha, Khulna
UCEP-Mohsin Khulna Technical School, 7, Junction Road, Baikali, Khulna

English medium schools

Rosedale International English School
South Herald English Medium School
Morning Bell English Medium School
Tulip English School
Sunflower Tutorial
Elizabeth Primary School
Military Collegiate School Khulna
Islamabad Collegiate School Khulna
Jahan International School

Art colleges

Khulna Art College (Now known as School of Fine Arts, Khulna University)

Polytechnic institutions

Khulna Polytechnic Institute, Khulna
Hazrat Shahjalal Polytechnic Institute, Khulna
Sundarban Institute of Technology, Boyra, Khulna.
Khanjahan Ali College Of Science And Technology, Khulna
Khulna Technical And Engineering College, Khulna
Khulna Mohila Polytechnic Institute, Khulna
Mangrove Institute Of Science And Technology, Khulna
North South Polytechnic Institute, Khulna
City Polytechnic Institute, Khulna
Hope Polytechnic Institute, Gollamari, Khulna
Squire Polytechnic Institute, Khulna
Squire Medical Institute, Khulna
PSTI(Public Science & Technology Institute) Polytechnic Institute,Khulna01917889284,01717283413

Military schools
Military Collegiate School Khulna, Patherbazar, Phooltala, Khulna.

See also 
 List of educational institutions in Barisal
 List of educational institutions in Sylhet

Educational institutions in Khulna
Khulna
Universities and colleges in Bangladesh
Education in Khulna
Educational institutions of Khulna Division